"Forgive Me Friend" is a song recorded by Swedish group Smith & Thell and Swedish Jam Factory, and released as a single on 10 August 2018.

In popular culture

In 2021, the song went viral on TikTok, appearing in more than
9,620 videos as of April 18, 2021.

Charts

Weekly charts

Year-end charts

Certifications

See also
 List of number-one singles of 2019 (Poland)

References

2018 singles
2018 songs
Number-one singles in Poland
Smith & Thell songs
Song articles with missing songwriters